This is a list of WBC world champions, showing every world champion certificated by the World Boxing Council (WBC). The WBC is one of the four major governing bodies in professional boxing, and certifies world champions in 18 different weight classes. In 1963, the year of its foundation, the WBC inaugurated titles in all divisions with the exception of light flyweight, super flyweight, super bantamweight, super middleweight, cruiserweight and bridgerweight, which were inaugurated in the subsequent decades. The most recent title inaugurated by the WBC is in the bridgerweight division in 2021.

Boxers who won the title but were stripped due to the title bout being overturned to a no contest are not listed.

Heavyweight

Bridgerweight

Cruiserweight

Light heavyweight

Super middleweight

Middleweight

Super welterweight

Welterweight

Super lightweight

Lightweight

Super featherweight

Featherweight

Super bantamweight

Bantamweight

Super flyweight

Flyweight

Light flyweight

Strawweight

See also
List of current world boxing champions
List of undisputed boxing champions
List of WBA world champions
List of IBF world champions
List of WBO world champions
List of The Ring world champions
List of WBC female world champions
List of IBO world champions
List of current WBC international champions
List of current WBC youth world champions

References

External links
Official list of current WBC champions

WBC
WBC